Arun Mallojirao Jayannavar (22 July 1956 - 22 November 2021) was an Indian condensed matter physicist and a senior professor at the Institute of Physics, Bhubaneswar. Known for his research on many interdisciplinary areas of condensed matter physics, Jayannavar was an elected fellow of all the three major Indian science academies viz. Indian Academy of Sciences, National Academy of Sciences, India and Indian National Science Academy. The Council of Scientific and Industrial Research, the apex agency of the government of India for scientific research, awarded Jayannavar the Shanti Swarup Bhatnagar Prize for Science and Technology, one of the highest Indian science awards, for his contributions to physical sciences in 1998.

Biography 

Born on 22 July 1956, Arun M. Jayannavar obtained a BSc from Govindram Seksaria Science College, Belgaum, Karnataka in 1976 and did his master's degree at Karnataka University to earn an MSc in 1978. His doctoral studies were at the Indian Institute of Science where he was mentored by S. S. Bhatnagar laureates, Narendra Kumar (physicist) and E. S. Raja Gopal and after securing a PhD in 1982, he moved to Italy to do his post-doctoral work at the International Centre for Theoretical Physics (ICTP) as a visiting scientist. Jayannavar also had a second stint abroad at the University of Ulm during 1988–90 as an Alexander von Humboldt Fellow. On his return to India in 1991, he joined the Institute of Physics, Bhubaneswar as a member of faculty where he holds the position of a senior professor. He was also a visiting senior professor at the Homi Bhabha National Institute of the Department of Atomic Energy, situated in Mumbai.

Legacy 

Jayannavar's research interests have been in the interdisciplinary areas of condensed matter physics, with special focus on theoretical condensed matter physics, Stochastic processes, non-equilibrium statistical mechanics, and classical and quantum problems in random media and physics of mesoscopic systems. High temperature superconductors, thermal ratchets and molecular motors, heat pumps at nanoscales, Anderson localization, delay times, random lasers, giant diffusion; fluctuation theorems are some of the areas he has worked on and he is reported to have made significant contributions in the elucidation of a number theoretical problems. Jayannavar's studies have been documented by way of a number of articles and the online article repository of the Indian Academy of Sciences has listed 168 of them. He was also a member of the editorial boards of science journals viz. Current Science and Pramana and sat in the executive council of Indian Physics Association from 2010 to 2012.

Awards and honors 
The International Centre for Theoretical Physics awarded Jayannavar the ICTP Prize in the field of solid state physics (in honour of Nevill Francis Mott) in 1996 and the Indian Academy of Sciences elected him as a fellow the same year. The Council of Scientific and Industrial Research awarded him the Shanti Swarup Bhatnagar Prize, one of the highest Indian science awards in 1998. Two of the other major Indian science academies, Indian National Science Academy and National Academy of Sciences, India elected Jayannavar as their fellow in 2002 and 2003 respectively and he received the G. D. Birla Award for Scientific Research in 2004.

Selected bibliography

See also 

 Mesoscopic physics
 Superconductivity

Notes

References

Further reading

External links 
 
 
 
 

Recipients of the Shanti Swarup Bhatnagar Award in Physical Science
Scientists from Bihar
Indian scientific authors
1956 births
Fellows of The National Academy of Sciences, India
Fellows of the Indian Academy of Sciences
Fellows of the Indian National Science Academy
Indian materials scientists
Indian condensed matter physicists
Academic staff of the University of Ulm
Homi Bhabha National Institute
Indian Institute of Science alumni
Karnatak University alumni
Living people